Thapar family is an Indian business family. They are not a single business group, and every branch of the family runs its own clutch of companies. 

The family Punjabi and belong to the Khatri community, whose traditional occupation is trade. The family's fortunes as a business house was founded by Karam Chand Thapar.

Prominent members
 Karam Chand Thapar
 Inder Mohan Thapar
 Vikram Thapar
 Ayesha Thapar, married to Nikesh Arora ,chief executive officer (CEO) and chairman of Palo Alto Networks
 Nitasha Thapar, married to Mukul Deora, son of Murli Deora
 Varun Thapar
 Brij Mohan Thapar
 Karan Thapar
 Gautam Thapar
 Lalit Mohan Thapar, never married
 Man Mohan Thapar
 Sameer Thapar
 Priya Thapar
 Sonia Thapar
 Arjun Thapar
Mrs. Surinder Lal
Naina Lal Kidwai, wife of Rasheed Kidwai
Nonita Lal Qureshi, wife of Pakistani golf champion Faisal Qureshi

See also
 Thapar Group
 Thapar University

 
Business families of India